Muhr is a place in Austria.

Muhr may also refer to:

Christopher Muhr, a German businessman
Muhr am See, a place in Bavaria, Germany
Muhr Awards, film awards given at the Dubai International Film Festival